Catherine Curtis Blake (born July 27, 1950) is a Senior United States district judge of the United States District Court for the District of Maryland.

Early life and education 
Blake was born in Boston, Massachusetts. After receiving an Artium Baccalaureus degree from Radcliffe College in 1972, she enrolled in Harvard Law School, where she received a Juris Doctor in 1975.

Career 

Blake was in private practice in Boston, from 1975 to 1977. She was with the Office of the United States Attorney for the District of Maryland from 1977 to 1987. During that period, she was an Assistant United States Attorney from 1977 to 1983, then became a first assistant from 1983 to 1985, when she was appointed by the court to serve as the United States Attorney, a position she  held until 1987, when she again became the first assistant.

Federal judicial service 

In 1987 Blake became a United States magistrate judge of the District of Maryland. In 1995, Blake became a United States District Judge of the United States District Court for the District of Maryland. She was nominated by President Bill Clinton on May 4, 1995, to a seat vacated by John R. Hargrove Sr. She was confirmed by the United States Senate on August 11, 1995, and received her commission on August 14, 1995. She served as Chief Judge of the District of Maryland from October 3, 2014 to October 6, 2017. She assumed senior status on April 2, 2021.

Judge Blake presided over the infamous Baltimore Gun Trace Task Force case. She is portrayed in the final episode of the HBO miniseries "We Own This City" which depicts the events surrounding the case.

References

External links
  

1950 births
Living people
20th-century American judges
21st-century American judges
20th-century American women judges
21st-century American women judges
Assistant United States Attorneys
Harvard Law School alumni
Judges of the United States District Court for the District of Maryland
People from Boston
Radcliffe College alumni
United States Attorneys for the District of Maryland
United States district court judges appointed by Bill Clinton
United States magistrate judges